Buntingford railway station is a former station in Buntingford, Hertfordshire, England. It served as the terminus of a branch from the Hertford East Branch Line.

The station was first opened in 1863 and closed to passengers in 1964.

References

Disused railway stations in Hertfordshire
Former Great Eastern Railway stations
Beeching closures in England
Railway stations in Great Britain opened in 1863
Railway stations in Great Britain closed in 1964
Buntingford